This bibliography of Darul Uloom Deoband is a selected list of generally available scholarly resources related to Darul Uloom Deoband, a leading Islamic seminary and Muslim theological centre in India at which the Deobandi movement began, founded in 1866. It is one of the most influential reform movements in modern Islam. It created a largest network of satellite madrasas all over the world especially India, Bangladesh, Pakistan, Afghanistan neighboring countries in Asia and beyond, and as far afield as the Caribbean, South Africa, United Kingdom and the United States. Islamic Revival in British India: Deoband, 1860-1900 by Barbara D. Metcalf was the first major monograph specifically devoted to the institutional and intellectual history of Deoband. Syed Mehboob Rizwi wrote History of Darul Uloom Deoband in 1977 in 2 volumes. This list will include Books and theses written on Darul Uloom Deoband and articles published about Deoband in various journals, newspapers, encyclopedias, seminars, websites etc. in APA style. Only bibliography related to Darul Uloom Deoband will be included here, for Deobandi movement, see Bibliography of Deobandi Movement.

Encyclopedias

Books

Theses

Journals

Newspapers

Documentaries

Seminars

Websites

Other

Theses

Books

See also 
 Bibliography of Deobandi Movement
 List of Darul Uloom Deoband alumni

References

External links 
 

Darul Uloom Deoband
Islam-related lists
Deobandi-related bibliographies
Lists of books
Education bibliographies